Gerrit "Gert" van der Meer (born 1950) is a Dutch film and television producer. Also known as a production manager, Van der Meer has worked on several Hollywood productions since 1980.

References

External links
 

1950s births
Living people
Dutch television producers
Dutch film producers
Dutch expatriates in the United States
Mass media people from Rotterdam
People from Venice, Los Angeles